Portuguese Railways may refer to

 Comboios de Portugal, the train operating company in Portugal, founded in 1951
 Rede Ferroviária Nacional, the infrastructure owner of the Portuguese rail network, founded in 1997